Joseph P. Lordi (June 28, 1919 – October 21, 1983) was an American law enforcement official who served as the Essex County, New Jersey prosecutor and as the first Chairman of the New Jersey Casino Control Commission.

Lordi was a counterespionage agent for the Office of Strategic Services in Europe during World War II. He later graduated from Rutgers School of Law–Newark.

Legal career
Lordi served as Deputy Attorney General of New Jersey under Gov. Robert Meyner and was an Assistant Essex County Prosecutor from 1959 to 1964.  Gov. Richard J. Hughes named him as Director of the New Jersey Alcoholic Beverage Commission, and in 1968 as the Essex County Prosecutor, replacing Brendan Byrne.  He spent nine years in that post, where he grew in prominence for his prosecution of organized crime figures and corrupt public officials.  Byrne named him as the first New Jersey Casino Control Commission Chairman, and he was sworn in on September 6, 1977. He served until 1981.

Family
Lordi's brother, James Lordi, served in the New Jersey General Assembly.  His daughter, Linda Lordi Cavanaugh, served as an Essex County Freeholder.

References

1919 births
1983 deaths
American prosecutors
Members of American gaming commissions
New Jersey lawyers
New Jersey Democrats
People of the Office of Strategic Services
People from Essex County, New Jersey
People from Spring Lake Heights, New Jersey
20th-century American lawyers